Thomas II de Multon (died 1271) Baron of Burgh and Gilsland, was an English noble.

He was the eldest son of Thomas de Multon and Ada de Morville. He succeeded his father in 1240. He died in 1271 and was succeeded by his grandson Thomas.

Marriage and issue
Thomas married Maud, daughter and sole heiress of Hubert de Vaux and Aline, they are known to have had the following known issue:
Thomas de Multon, married Isabella, had issue.
Hubert de Multon, married firstly Ada la Brune, had issue and secondly Margaret du Bois, also with issue.
James de Multon, had issue.
Aline de Multon, married William de Braose, 1st Baron Braose, had issue.

Citations

References
Calendar of Inquisitions Post Mortem and Other Analogous Documents Preserved in the Public Record Office (H.M. Stationery Office, London, 1912) Vol. 3 Edward I.

13th-century English people
1271 deaths